Juan Gavazzo (13 December 1888 – 14 April 1965) was an Argentine artist. His work was part of the art competition at the 1932 Summer Olympics.

References

1888 births
1965 deaths
Argentine artists
Olympic competitors in art competitions